Agness Musase (born 11 July 1997) is a Zambian footballer who plays as a defender for the Zambia women's national team. She competed for Zambia at the 2018 Africa Women Cup of Nations, playing in three matches.

References

1997 births
Living people
Zambian women's footballers
Zambia women's international footballers
Women's association football defenders
Footballers at the 2020 Summer Olympics
Olympic footballers of Zambia